Prism usually refers to:
 Prism (optics), a transparent optical component with flat surfaces that refract light
 Prism (geometry), a kind of polyhedron

Prism may also refer to:

Science and mathematics
 Prism (geology), a type of sedimentary deposit
 Prism (surveying), a type of target
 Prism correction, a component of some eyeglass prescriptions

Government
 PRISM, a surveillance program run by the US National Security Agency
 PRISM (website), an educational portal website for Indiana teachers
 Oregon Performance Reporting Information System, a state agency

Media and entertainment

Publications
 Prism (comics), a Marvel Comics character
 Prism International, a Canadian literary magazine
 PRism (journal), an academic journal covering public relations
 ASEE Prism, the flagship publication of the American Society for Engineering Education
 Prism Comics, an organization that supports LGBT people in the comics industry
 The Prism Pentad, a series of Dungeons & Dragons novels by Troy Denning

Music
 Prism (band), a Canadian rock band
 Prism (Prism album), the debut album of the Canadian band
 Prism (Japanese band), a jazz fusion band
 Prism (Beth Nielsen Chapman album)
 Prism (Dave Holland album)
 Prism (Jeff Scott Soto album)
 Prism (Joanne Brackeen album)
 Prism (Katy Perry album)
 Prism (Lindsey Stirling song)
 Prism (Matthew Shipp album)
 Prism (Ryo Kawasaki album)
 Prism (Yoshida Brothers album)
 Prism (Rainbow EP)
 Prism Records, an American record label

Other
 Prism (play), a 2017 play by Terry Johnson
 Prism (opera), a 2018 opera by Ellen Reid
 PRISM (TV network), a defunct cable television channel in Philadelphia, United States
 Prism (street artist), street artist from Melbourne, Australia
 Prism Leisure Corporation, a distribution and publishing company in the United Kingdom

Computing
 Publishing Requirements for Industry Standard Metadata, XML metadata vocabularies for syndicating, aggregating, post-processing and multi-purposing content

Hardware
 Prism (chipset), a wireless networking chipset
 Apollo PRISM, a microprocessor made by Apollo Computer
 DEC PRISM, a cancelled processor architecture designed by Digital Equipment Corporation
 SGI Prism, a computer
 Prism Micro Products, a British telecommunications company that produced modems for the Micronet 800 network
 PR/SM, an IBM mainframe hypervisor

Software
 Delphi Prism, a software development environment for .NET and Mono
 Mozilla Prism, a software product for desktop integration of web applications
 PRISM model checker, a probabilistic model checker
 GraphPad Prism, software for scientific graphing, biostatistics and curve fitting

Other uses
 PRISM (reactor), a small nuclear power plant design
 A retroreflector, used in surveying
 Prism Rail, a British passenger rail company
 Prism Motorsports, a defunct NASCAR team  
 Nokia Prism, a fashion mobile phone collection
 Prism (video game), a video game about manipulating 3D shapes

See also
 Prismatic (disambiguation)
 Prizm (disambiguation)